Sivaganga railway station serves the city of Sivaganga, India. The station belongs to the Madurai railway division and is a major transit point in Sivagangai district. It is also known by its official code: SVGA. It is under the station category B. It is one of the district headquarters railway station in India.

History
History of this station goes back to British Rule. During Colonial India, This station served as a Terminal Railway Station of Manamadurai - Sivagangai Branch Line. Later new railway line was built between Trichinopoly (now Tiruchirappalli) to Pudukkottai for goods transport. In order to establish a direct rail link in-between Sivagangai to Pudukkottai a railway line was established via Karaikudi. Later Aranthangi Tiruvarur line was extended until Karaikudi from Aranthangi in order ease movement of goods to Nagapattinam Port. So it made Karaikudi as a Junction. Sivagangai is the oldest stations in Tiruchirappalli Manamadurai Section.

Location and layout 

The Sivaganga railway station is located at the outskirt of Sivagangai town.
The train station falls on the Manamadurai–Trichirappalli broad-gauge line. Almost every daily Express train or long-distance trains has a halt in the station.

Despite Sivaganga being one of the important railway stations in Madurai division, the railway station has only 3 platforms and no starting trains from the town. It is one of the district headquarters railway station. About 10000 passengers travel to Sivaganga per day despite not being a railway station.

Platform 1 can accommodate 24 coach train which spans about 705 yards where as platforms 2 and 3 can accommodate only 17 to 18 coach trains as these 2 platform spans with a length of 530 yards only. The height of platform 2 and 3 is also considerably lower when compared with platform 1. This station has a pedestrian overpass and platform shelters at necessary places.

The nearest airport to the station is the Madurai Airport situated 50  km west of the city. The nearby stations are the suburbs of Melakonnakulam towards the south and Panangudi towards the North.

Some of the important tourist attractions near the station includes shri sowmya narayana perumal temple of Thirukoshtiyur at a distance of 25 km, sri swarna kaaleshwarar temple of kalayarkovil at a distance of 19 km, Nattarasankottai shri kannathal temple, kollangudi kaliamman temple.

This station is surrounded by many educational institutions such as schools and colleges as well as some industries, so this station has a good footfall during office hours.

Gallery

See also 
Sethu Express
Boat Mail
Silambu Express

References

External links
 

Madurai railway division
Railway stations in Sivaganga district